Noch' pered rozhdestvom (Russian: Ночь пе́ред Рождество́м, literally "Night Before Christmas") can refer to:

 "Christmas Eve" (Gogol), short story by Nikolai Gogol
 Christmas Eve (opera) (1894-95) by Rimsky-Korsakov
 The Night Before Christmas (1913 film)
 The Night Before Christmas (1951 film)

See also
 The Night Before Christmas (disambiguation)